The following is an overview of events in 2007 in film, including the highest-grossing films, award ceremonies and festivals, a list of films released and notable deaths. The highest-grossing film of the year was Pirates of the Caribbean: At World's End, which was just ahead of Harry Potter and the Order of the Phoenix. 2007 is often considered one of the greatest years for film in the 21st century. This would also be the last year in which no films grossed at least $1 billion at the box office until 2020, when the COVID-19 pandemic prevented multiple theatrically released films.

Evaluation of the year
Many have considered 2007 to be the greatest year for film in the 21st century and one of the greatest of all time.

In his article from April 18, 2017, which highlighted the best movies of 2007, critic Mark Allison of Den of Geek said, "2007 must surely be remembered as one of the finest years in English-language film-making, quite possibly the best of this century so far. Like 1939, 1976, or 1994, it was one of those years in which a succession of veritable classics came into being. So many, in fact, that some of the best examples were cruelly overlooked by the hype machine of the day." He also emphasized, "If 2007 proves anything, it's that classic films aren't just a relic of ages past; they're being made all around us. I can't wait to see what we're watching in another ten years' time."

Critic Craig Johnson from the film review and movie list website Taste of Cinema said in an article from December 16, 2014, "For one glorious year, it (2007) was like the 1970s all over again. Smart characters were using their brains as weapons. Movie stars were challenging themselves with tough roles. Punches were not pulled. Happy endings were not guaranteed. There was a parade of intelligent movies, seemingly made for adults to watch while the kids were watching Transformers".

Highest-grossing films

The top 10 films released in 2007 by worldwide gross are as follows:

Events

Awards

2007 films 
The list of films released in 2007, arranged by country, are as follows:
 American films
 Argentine films
 Australian films
 Bengali films
 Bollywood films
 Brazilian films
 British films
 French films
 Hong Kong films
 Italian films
 Japanese films
 Mexican films
 Pakistani films
 Russian films
 South Korean films
 Spanish films
 List of Kannada films of 2007
Malayalam films
 Tamil films
 Telugu films

Births
 February 16 – Choi Ro-woon, South Korean actor
 March 4 – Miya Cech,  American actress
 March 5 – Roman Griffin Davis,  British actor
 March 28 – Cailey Fleming, American actress
 July 18 – JD McCrary, American singer, dancer and actor
 September 14 – Heo Jung-eun, South Korean actress
 November 3  – Ever Anderson, American actress and model
 [[December 4 – Scarlett Estevez, American actress

Deaths

Film debuts
 Gemma Arterton – St. Trinian's
 Matt Berry – The Devil's Chair
 Asa Butterfield - Son of Rambow
 Gabriel Chavarria – Freedom Writers
 MC Chris – Aqua Teen Hunger Force Colon Movie Film for Theaters
 C. Martin Croker – Aqua Teen Hunger Force Colon Movie Film for Theaters
 Michael Fassbender – 300
 Andrew Garfield – Lions for Lambs
 Matt Groening (animator) – The Simpsons Movie
 Tom Hiddleston – Unrelated
 Ken Jeong – Knocked Up
 Zoë Kravitz – No Reservations
 Carey Means – Aqua Teen Hunger Force Colon Movie Film for Theaters
 Andy Merrill – Aqua Teen Hunger Force Colon Movie Film for Theaters
 Christopher Mintz-Plasse – Superbad
 Jordan Peele – Twisted Fortune
 Craig Robinson – D-War
 Rico Rodriguez – Epic Movie
 Saoirse Ronan – I Could Never Be Your Woman
 Andy Samberg – Hot Rod
 Cedric Sanders – American Gangster
 Dana Snyder – Dante's Inferno
 Emma Stone – Superbad
 Jason Sudeikis – The Ten
 Katherine Waterston – Michael Clayton

References

External links
2007 release schedule at Box Office Mojo
Movie titles from 2007 at IMDb
2007 UK release schedule at Film Distributors Association 
Online Film 

 
Film by year